The 2011 Campeonato Argentino de Rugby  2011, the most important tournament for provincial teams in Argentina, and the older national tournament was played between 26 March and 23 April.
The victory rose to the selection of Unión Cordobesa de Rugby led by the former Italian national team player Ramiro Pez.  Like in the previous season, the teams were divided on three levels ("Campeonato", "Ascenso", "Promocional") with a promotion/relegation format between the levels.

"Campeonato"
Two pools of four teams. The first two advanced semifinals, the last to relegation/promotion playoff.

Pool 1

Pool 2

Semifinals 

 Buenos Aires qualified after overtime, having scored the first try of the match.

Final 

’’’Buenos Aires’’’ : 15.Dimas Suffern Quirno, 14.Francisco Bosch, 13.Simón Montes, 12.Marcelo Soiza (cap), 11.Germán Villamil , 10.Valentín Cruz (18' Bautista Güemes), 9. Francisco Cubelli (68’Francisco Albarracín), 8.Alejandro Galli, 7.Cristian Etchart, 6 Juan Pablo González Bonorino  5. Gonzalo Delguy, 4.Ramiro Herrera, 3 Francisco Gómez Kodela (68' Francisco Piccinini), 2.Francisco Lecot, 1. Conrado González Bravo. Coach: Rolando Martín, Diego Cash and Gustavo Cohen.
 Cordoba   : 15. Gastón Revol, 14. Fernando Luna (76’ Federico Salazar), 13. Lisandro Gómez López, 12. Santiago Tobal (72’ Facundo Baglio), 11. Facundo Barrea, 10.Ramiro Pez, 9. Martín Manieri (76’ Mariano García, 8. Lucas Paschini (51-60’ Miguel Murer), 7. José Basile (cap.), 6. Rodrigo Bruno, 5. Hugo Schierano (48’ Gerardo Isaías), 4. Alejandro Allub, 3. Matías Narváez (45’ Gastón Cortés), 2. Federico Fortuna, 1. Daniel Rodríguez. Coach: Daniel Tobal, Guillermo Taleb and Javier Fiori.

"Ascenso"

Pool 1 

 San Juan to the play-off for promotion in "Torneo Campeonato"
 Entre Rios to play-out for relegation

Pool 2 

 Alto Valle to the play-off for promotion in "Torneo Campeonato"
 Austral to the play-out for relegation

Play off for promotion in "Campeonato" 
The winner of each pool of "ascenso" play against one of the last of the pools of "Campeonato"

 Mar del Plata remain in "Torneo Campeonato"

 Santa Fe relegated in "Ascenso"
 San Juan promoted in "Campeonato"

Relegation Play out 

 Austral relegated in the "Promocional" tournament

Promocional 
New formula: the nine teams play a tournament called "Super 9" in two days with match with reduced time All the match were played in Junin
The winner of the "Copa " were promoted to "Ascenso"Finali il 2 April con promozione alla"Ascenso" della vincente della "Copa de oro"

First phase

Copa de Oro 

 Andina promoted to the Tournament "Ascenso" 2012.

Copa de Plata

Copa de bronce

External links 
  Memorias de la UAR 2011
  Francesco Volpe, Paolo Pacitti (Author), Rugby 2012, GTE Gruppo Editorale (2011)
  Torneo Argentino 2011 on rugby fun
  Torneo Argentino 2011 Zona Ascenso on rugby fun

Campeonato Argentino de Rugby
Argentina
Campeonato